The Carolina Panthers' history formally dates back to 1993, when the NFL awarded the franchise to Charlotte, North Carolina. The Panthers, along with the Jacksonville Jaguars, began play in the 1995 NFL season as expansion teams. They have played in Charlotte since 1996, winning six division titles and two NFC Championships. The Panthers were the first NFL franchise based in the Carolinas and the second professional sports team based in Charlotte, the first being the NBA's Charlotte Hornets.

Origins: 1987–1994
In 1987, shortly after it was decided that Charlotte would receive an expansion National Basketball Association franchise (the Hornets), former Baltimore Colts wide receiver, North Carolina native and businessman Jerry Richardson met with a group of potential backers to discuss the possibility of bringing an NFL expansion team to the Carolinas region. Richardson Sports, a company made by Richardson, decided upon a spot in the uptown section of Charlotte to build a privately financed stadium seating more than 70,000 fans.

Richardson's announcement created a buzz in the region, as politicians, businessmen, and citizens all joined together to show the NFL that a team could be supported in the area. United States Senators Jesse Helms of North Carolina and Ernest Hollings of South Carolina put aside their partisan differences to lobby NFL owners to support the expansion. Meanwhile, then-North Carolina Governor James G. Martin and then-South Carolina Governor Carroll A. Campbell, Jr. created a committee of citizens from both states to help the cause. Preseason games were held in the region in 1989, 1990, and 1991. The first two were held at Carter–Finley Stadium in Raleigh, North Carolina, and Kenan Memorial Stadium in Chapel Hill, North Carolina, respectively, while the third game was held at Williams-Brice Stadium in Columbia, South Carolina. The matchups were between existing NFL teams and all three games were sold out as part of the fans' efforts to show their support.

In 1992, the NFL released their list of five areas open to a potential NFL team: Baltimore, Maryland; St. Louis, Missouri; Memphis, Tennessee; Jacksonville, Florida; and the Carolinas, represented by Charlotte. After the vote was delayed because of a dispute between the players and the league, the race began again in 1993. In June of that year, Richardson Sports announced that they would finance the stadium through the sale of Permanent Seat Licenses, club seats, and luxury boxes. In a stunning show of fan support, all seats were sold out by the end of the first day.

The feasibility of the team was no longer a question, but it was still up to the league to decide where the new team would go. On October 26, 1993, the league announced that the owners had unanimously voted for the Carolinas to receive the 29th franchise, the first new NFL team since 1976 (Jacksonville was named the 30th team a month later). Fans all over the region celebrated with fireworks. In a memorable moment during the expansion announcement conference, Richardson spoke directly into a camera feed going to the Carolinas to thank the 40,000 people who had purchased the PSLs and allowing the stadium to be built without a burden to the taxpayers.

Even though St. Louis and Baltimore lost out on their expansion bids, they eventually acquired new teams: the Los Angeles Rams moved to St. Louis in 1995 (however, the Rams would return to Los Angeles in 2016), and as the result of the 1996 Cleveland Browns relocation controversy, the Baltimore Ravens were established by the league as technically a new expansion team. Memphis also temporarily received a team when the Houston Oilers relocated in 1996 to Tennessee, intending to play the 1997 and 1998 seasons in Liberty Bowl Memorial Stadium while what is now called Nissan Stadium in Nashville was being constructed.

The Panthers would be assigned to the NFC West to increase the size of that division to five teams; there were already two other southeastern teams in the division, the Atlanta Falcons and the New Orleans Saints, making Charlotte the easternmost city in the division.

Dom Capers era: 1995–1998
The Panthers hired Dom Capers as their inaugural head coach. Capers was formerly the defensive coordinator for the Pittsburgh Steelers.

1995 season

During the 1995 NFL Expansion Draft, Rod Smith was the first player selected by the Panthers. During the 1995 NFL Draft, the Panthers made their first significant addition (in terms of long-term contributions to the team) by drafting Penn State quarterback Kerry Collins. Upon entering the NFL in 1995, the Panthers and Jacksonville Jaguars set about building their respective squads with a luxury not afforded to previous expansion teams: free agency. The Panthers made excellent use of the tool, picking up wide receiver Don Beebe, linebacker Sam Mills, and placekicker John Kasay. The Panthers won the annual Hall of Fame Game against the fellow expansion Jacksonville Jaguars 20–14 (a game known as the "Battle of the Big Cats", due to the similar nicknames of the franchises) on July 29, 1995. General manager Bill Polian, who had built the Buffalo Bills teams that won four consecutive AFC Championships a few years prior, brought many of the contributors from that squad to Carolina, including Carlton Bailey, Frank Reich, Pete Metzelaars and Beebe.

The home games during the season were played at Clemson University, as the Panthers stadium in Charlotte was still under construction.  This made the Panthers the only sports team in one of the Big Four leagues ever based out of South Carolina, even if only for one year. The Panthers originally wanted to play their first season in Williams-Brice Stadium in Columbia, South Carolina, which was closer and more accessible to Charlotte, but the University of South Carolina turned them down.

Despite being drafted first, Kerry Collins was not the team's first starting QB, that distinction instead going to Frank Reich. The Panthers first regular season game was against the Atlanta Falcons in the Georgia Dome. The Panthers scored on their first three possessions to take a 13–0 lead before the Falcons rallied to win 23–20 in overtime. The Panthers first home game (in Clemson) was a 31–10 loss to the St. Louis Rams. Reich only played in the first three games but was the first Panthers QB to throw a touchdown pass. Collins assumed starting QB duties in week 4. Following an 0–5 start to the season, the Panthers won their first game against the New York Jets 26–15 on October 15, 1995, after linebacker Sam Mills returned an interception 36 yards for a touchdown. Later that year, the Panthers stunned the league by not only winning four consecutive games (an expansion team record), but defeating the defending Super Bowl champion San Francisco 49ers 13–7, the first time an expansion team had beaten the reigning champs. The Panthers finished their season 7–9, more than doubling the previous record of a first year expansion team.

1996 season: Playoff Debut

In the 1996 NFL Draft, the Panthers used their first pick on running back Tim Biakabutuka, and their second pick on wide receiver Muhsin Muhammad, both players would have successful careers with the team. During the off-season, they also picked up quarterback Steve Beuerlein, tight end Wesley Walls, and linebacker Kevin Greene. After playing their home games in Clemson, South Carolina during their first season, the Panthers began play at the newly completed Ericsson Stadium in Charlotte, North Carolina starting in September. The team's second year proved even better than the first; following a 5–4 start, the players found a groove and rattled off a seven-game winning streak to end the season with a record of 12–4. They ended up winning the NFC West division for the first and only time in franchise history.

In their first ever playoff game, they beat the Dallas Cowboys 26–17 in the NFC Divisional Playoffs at Ericsson Stadium. The following week, however, they fell to the eventual Super Bowl champion Green Bay Packers 30–13 in the NFC Championship. Their fellow second-year expansion team, the Jacksonville Jaguars, played in the AFC Championship against the New England Patriots but lost 20–6; the NFL nearly had an all-expansion Super Bowl. Following the successful season, the Panthers were represented at the Pro Bowl by eight players, including Kerry Collins, John Kasay, Sam Mills, and Michael Bates among others. Capers also won NFL Coach of the Year, becoming the first Panthers coach to win the award.

1997 season

The Panthers picked up several talented players in the 1997 NFL Draft, including safety Mike Minter, tight end Kris Mangum, and also signed running back Fred Lane as an undrafted free agent. Following an impressive second season, the Panthers fully expected to return to the playoffs in 1997, but a 2–4 start quickly began to cloud the minds of Carolina fans. The team finished their third season with a record of 7–9, and missed the playoffs. The Panthers lost their first ever appearance on Monday Night Football by a score of 34–21 to the San Francisco 49ers. They were also shut out for the first time in franchise history in a week 11 loss to the Denver Broncos, 34–0.

1998 season

The Panthers started the 1998 season 0–7, the franchise's worst start ever. Quarterback Kerry Collins started the first four games for the team before Steve Beuerlein was given the starting job; he started the season's remaining 12 games. The team got their first win of the year with a 31–17 victory over the New Orleans Saints in week 9, breaking a nine-game losing streak dating back to the previous season. After rallying to win their last two games, the Panthers finished the year 4–12, their worst record in franchise history at the time. Kerry Collins, who was dealing with alcoholism, was released following the season. Head coach Dom Capers was also let go after four seasons with the franchise.

George Seifert era: 1999–2001
After Dom Capers was let go following the 1998 season, retired coach George Seifert was hired as the second head coach in Panthers history. Seifert had won two Super Bowls as the head coach of the San Francisco 49ers, and had a reputation for winning with talented and experienced teams.

1999 season

The Panthers picked up several players in the 1999 NFL Draft, including defensive end Mike Rucker. In Seifert's first season with the team, the Panthers finished with an 8–8 record, a four-game improvement from the previous season, and their first .500 record in franchise history. Following a 2–5 start, they finished 6–3 in their last 9 games, including a last-second victory over Green Bay where QB Steve Beuerlein ran in for the game-winning score, and a 45–13 home victory over the division rival New Orleans Saints in the final game of the season. However, the team missed out on a wildcard playoff berth through a complicated tiebreaker based on total points scored. The team also had to deal with issues outside of football. Wide receiver Rae Carruth, taken with the Panthers first pick of the 1997 Draft, was arrested in 1999 for conspiring to murder his pregnant girlfriend and was later convicted.

2000 season

In the 2000 NFL Draft, safety Deon Grant and linebacker Lester Towns were among the players selected by the Panthers. In Seifert's second season with the team, the Panthers finished 7–9, one game worse than the previous season, and missed the playoffs for the fourth consecutive season. They finished third in the NFC West, behind the playoff-bound St. Louis Rams and New Orleans Saints. Veteran quarterback Steve Beuerlein, who had been the team's starting quarterback since 1998, was released following the season. Tragedy struck the team when former running back Fred Lane, who had been a member of the Panthers for three seasons, was shot and killed by his wife during a domestic dispute in 2000 after signing with the Indianapolis Colts.

2001 season: 15 straight losses

Seifert's third and final season with the Panthers was a disaster. After the team released Beuerlein in the off-season Siefert handed the QB reins to Jeff Lewis, who was released after several poor performances during the preseason. That left the Panthers with rookie Chris Weinke under center. Weinke had won the Heisman Trophy and led Florida State to a national championship in college but was unable to duplicate that level of success in the NFL. The Panthers won their opening game against the Minnesota Vikings 24–13, but then lost 15 straight games. This set a record for single-season losing streaks which held until the Detroit Lions' 0–16 campaign of 2008. The Panthers also finished last in their division for the first time in franchise history.

Seifert was fired the day after the 2001 season ended and the team set out to find its third head coach. Although his final season was the worst in team history, Seifert did help select several outstanding players in the 2001 NFL Draft including linebacker Dan Morgan, defensive tackle Kris Jenkins and wide receiver Steve Smith, each of whom earned Pro Bowl berths and All-Pro awards while playing for the Panthers. Smith, who played thirteen seasons with the team, was considered one of the most electrifying and explosive wide receivers in the game.

The Panthers played their final season as a member of the NFC West in 2001, as the team joined longtime rivals Atlanta and New Orleans, along with the Tampa Bay Buccaneers (who were members of the NFC Central) in the new NFC South division, as part of the realignment for the upcoming season.

John Fox era: 2002–2010
After Seifert was fired following the disastrous 2001 season, the Panthers hired New York Giants defensive coordinator John Fox as the team's third head coach. Fox was known for defensive discipline and it would be needed to improve a team that had finished in the bottom of the defensive rankings the previous year.

2002 season

Fox looked to the 2002 NFL Draft to begin revamping the franchise, starting with the second overall pick; defensive end Julius Peppers. Peppers was a dominating defensive end at the University of North Carolina and he was a solid fit for Fox's defensive plan. The Panthers also picked up linebacker Will Witherspoon and running back DeShaun Foster in the draft. Peppers combined with fellow defensive end Mike Rucker and defensive tackles Brentson Buckner and Kris Jenkins to form what many football experts at the time called the best defensive line in the game. Meanwhile, safety Mike Minter anchored the secondary, while Witherspoon (affectionately called "Spoon" by fans and teammates) and Mark Fields led the linebacker corps. Veteran Rodney Peete led the offense at QB. Fox's defense-first philosophy worked well as the Panthers improved to 7–9 (a six-game improvement over the previous year) and posted the league's second-best overall defense, including allowing a league-low 3.69 yards per rushing attempt.

After spending their first seven seasons in the geographically inaccurate NFC West, the Panthers, along with their longtime rivals the Atlanta Falcons and New Orleans Saints were placed in the new NFC South division for the 2002 season.

2003 season: The Cardiac Cats

The 2003 season began with the Panthers drafting several young prospects, including Ricky Manning, Jr. at cornerback, and Jordan Gross at offensive tackle. In addition, then-unknown quarterback Jake Delhomme, running back Stephen Davis, and former Rams wide receiver Ricky Proehl were signed in the off-season, making additions to an offense that needed to complement a top-ranked defense. The team was not without tragedy, however, as it was revealed that former linebacker and coach Sam Mills was diagnosed with intestinal cancer; additionally, linebacker Mark Fields was diagnosed with Hodgkin's Disease. The team used their struggle as inspiration, and started the season 5–0. Delhomme, a former Saints backup, replaced Rodney Peete at quarterback by halftime of the season opener against the Jacksonville Jaguars. He led the Panthers to a fourth quarter comeback, thus winning the starting job. Delhomme eventually led the team to an 11–5 record, the NFC South Division title and a playoff berth.

In the playoffs, they easily defeated the Cowboys 29–10 in a home wild-card game before facing the St. Louis Rams in the divisional playoff game in the Edward Jones Dome. Carolina had an 11-point lead in the last 3 minutes of play, but a touchdown from Marshall Faulk, a successful two-point conversion, and an onside kick that led to a field goal tied the game and sent it to overtime. Both John Kasay and Jeff Wilkins missed potential game-winning kicks in the first overtime, but In the first play of the 2nd OT, however, Jake Delhomme hit Steve Smith with a 69-yard touchdown pass to win the game, 29–23, sending the Panthers into the NFC Championship game against the Philadelphia Eagles. The Eagles, led by Donovan McNabb, were in the NFC title match for the 3rd year in a row, but lost it as the Panthers shut down the Eagles offense and, with a 14–3 victory, headed to their first Super Bowl against the New England Patriots. The multiple close games, won either in overtime or with a slim margin, gave way to a new nickname for the Panthers: the "Cardiac Cats."

Super Bowl XXXVIII

At Super Bowl XXXVIII, neither team was able to put up points in the first quarter, and the game remained scoreless until near the end of the first half. However, 24 points were scored in the last 5 minutes of the first half, and the score going into halftime was 14–10 New England. The third quarter was also scoreless and it wasn't until late in the game that things heated up once again. The teams traded leads numerous times in the highest-scoring fourth quarter in Super Bowl history, including setting a record when Jake Delhomme hit Muhsin Muhammad for an 85-yard touchdown pass early in the fourth quarter. That pass made the score 22–21, Carolina and went down in the record books as the longest offensive play in Super Bowl history. After New England responded with a touchdown of their own and a 2-point conversion to make it 29–22, Carolina would storm right back to tie the game with a touchdown pass to Ricky Proehl with 1:08 left in regulation, opening the possibility to the first overtime game in Super Bowl history. However, John Kasay's kickoff went out of bounds, giving the Patriots the ball on their own 40-yard line. Adam Vinatieri, who had won Super Bowl XXXVI two years earlier on a last-second field goal, repeated his heroics, connecting on a 41-yarder with four seconds left, even though he had already missed two field goals in the game. This gave the Patriots their second Super Bowl win in three years.

2004 season

Experts all picked the Panthers to repeat their 2003 season success in 2004. Having selected cornerback Chris Gamble and wide receiver Keary Colbert with their top two picks in the 2004 draft, and not having lost any core players from their Super Bowl run, the team looked ready for their 10th Anniversary season. In addition, Mark Fields, who had missed the previous season with Hodgkin's disease, returned and was ready to go. But the team suffered major injuries early on, as Steve Smith broke his leg in the season opener against Green Bay, Stephen Davis suffered a knee injury before the second game of the season, and Kris Jenkins had shoulder problems that benched him for the year. In fact, the Panthers had 14 players on injured reserve, including their top four running backs, more than any other team. This led to a 1–7 start, and people began wondering if they would repeat the 1–15 season of 2001. However, backup fullback Nick Goings stepped up to the challenge with five 100-yd rushing games, Keary Colbert played better than most rookies thrown into the #2 receiver spot, and the defense held together despite the injuries to help the team win 6 of their last 8 games, finishing 7–9. The Panthers barely missed the playoffs after losing a close game to New Orleans, when a 60-yard field goal attempt fell just short as time expired.

Among things the Panthers did in 2004 to celebrate the 10th anniversary of the franchise was name a 10th Anniversary All-Time Team. With the exception of tight end Wesley Walls, every offensive starter was on the team during their Super Bowl run of 2003. The only defensive players to make the anniversary team that played in the Super Bowl were the front four (Peppers, Rucker, Jenkins and Buckner), linebacker Dan Morgan, and safety Mike Minter. Pro Bowl punter Todd Sauerbrun made the squad as well. Naturally, kicker John Kasay made the team, since he had been the team's kicker since its inception.

2005 season

Despite a home-opening loss to the New Orleans Saints to start off the 2005 season, the Panthers got revenge against the two-time defending champion New England Patriots for the loss in Super Bowl XXXVIII, winning the rematch by a final score of 27–17. Despite going on the road and losing a close game to the Miami Dolphins 27–24, the Panthers managed to get a six-game winning streak going, including a win at home on Monday Night Football against the Green Bay Packers. In a home game against the Minnesota Vikings, Steve Smith, who had already emerged as one of the league's best wide receivers had a real breakthrough, catching 11 passes for 201 yards and 1 touchdown, with his longest reception of the game being 69 yards. Jake Delhomme also enjoyed one of his best outings in years, completing 21 of 29 passes for 341 yards and three touchdowns, giving Delhomme a nomination for FedEx Air Player of The Week.

Their winning streak came to an end however at the hands of the Chicago Bears. The #1 defense held the Panthers to just three points, as they lost the game 13–3. After losing to the Cowboys in the season's penultimate game, the Panthers needed a victory to secure a spot in the playoffs. They responded with a dominating New Year's Day performance at the Georgia Dome, a 44–11 victory over the Falcons, making the score the largest margin of victory in franchise history, and the first time since 1997 that the Panthers were able to beat the Falcons in the Georgia Dome. With that victory, the Panthers secured themselves the NFC's #5 seed.

The Panthers began their post-season play on Sunday January 8, 2006 at Giants Stadium against the New York Giants. After both sides failed to score in the first quarter, the trifecta of Delhomme, DeShaun Foster, and Smith showed dominance as they shut out the Giants 23–0. New York was the nation's number one television market, and the shutout in the playoffs was significant.

Their next opponent was the Chicago Bears, home to the nation's third largest television market. The Panthers defeated them at Soldier Field with a final score of 29–21. With that victory, the Panthers advanced to the NFC Championship Game for the third time in the franchise's 11-year history. However, during the Chicago game Foster suffered a crushing ankle injury that would keep him indefinitely sidelined. Also, star defensive end Julius Peppers re-injured an ailing shoulder. The next weekend they played against the Seattle Seahawks for the NFC Championship, but injuries and playing on the road for the fourth straight week caught up with the Panthers and they came up short, losing 34–14.

2006 season

In the 2006 NFL Draft, the Panthers drafted running back Deangelo Williams in the first round. Coming off a playoff season and with new acquisition Keyshawn Johnson, the Panthers sold out Bank of America Stadium 15 minutes after tickets went on sale. An early injury to Smith led to a two-game losing streak, but his return coincided with a four-game winning run. However, Delhomme was injured soon after and was lost for three games. In the end, the team finished 8–8 and missed the playoffs. Following the season, offensive coordinator Dan Henning was fired and Johnson retired, becoming an NFL analyst for ESPN for several years.

2007 season

Among the players the team drafted that offseason was WR Dwayne Jarrett, picked in the second round of the 2007 NFL Draft. Jarrett would become a major draft bust. The Panthers began the season as playoff contenders, and won their opener against the St. Louis Rams for the first time since 2003. The following week at home against the Houston Texans, the Panthers jumped ahead 14–0 but lost 34–21, unable to fend off a relentless passing attack by the Texans. In week three against the Atlanta Falcons, Delhomme was lost for the season with an injured elbow, which resulted in Tommy John surgery. After a close loss to the Tampa Bay Buccaneers in week 4, the Panthers got back on the winning track behind the passing arm of former Houston Texans QB David Carr, who drew from the playbook of his 2006 defeat of the Indianapolis Colts by engineering two 4th-quarter drives; the first for a TD, and the last to set up the game-winning field goal by John Kasay to defeat the New Orleans Saints. Unfortunately for the Panthers, the unpopular Carr suffered the first major injury of his career, badly injuring his back against the Saints. After returning to the game in the second half to get the win, Carr would play sparingly for the rest of the year, forcing the Panthers to rely on a combination of 44-year-old Vinny Testaverde and rookie Matt Moore for the remainder of the season. The Panthers finished 7–9, and missed the playoffs again.

2008 season

The Panthers picked up several talented players in the 2008 NFL Draft, including running back Jonathan Stewart, and offensive tackle Jeff Otah. With the help of a much improved rushing offense, the Panthers rebounded, finishing the season with a 12–4 record. This included an 8–0 home record. After defeating the New Orleans Saints 33–31 in the season finale, the Panthers claimed their second NFC South title and a first round bye in the playoffs. However, on January 10 the Panthers' season came to a disappointing end, as they lost to the Arizona Cardinals 33–13 at home in the Divisional round. The Panthers' offense was plagued by Delhomme's 6 turnovers (5 interceptions and a fumble) and the Cardinals 27 first-half points.

2009 season

Carolina hoped to make another playoff run in 2009. The 2009 season opener witnessed Carolina lose at the hands of the Eagles (including Delhomme's six turnovers), followed by losses to Atlanta and Dallas. The Panthers got their first win in week 5 against Washington. In Week 6, they defeated their division rival Buccaneers 28–21, a game that was most notable for cornerback Dante Wesley launching himself into the neck of Tampa Bay punt returner Clifton Smith after Smith had waved for a fair catch. Smith was knocked unconscious and Wesley ejected for his actions after a brief fight broke out between both teams. Wesley was suspended one game and fined $20,000. There followed an uneven string of wins and losses. After 11 games, a recently injured Delhomme was benched, and replaced at starting QB by Matt Moore. With a more aggressive offense in place, the Panthers won four of their last five games, including their last three. These victories included an impressive 26–7 sweep of playoff-bound Minnesota. They then crushed the Giants 41–9 in the last game at Giants Stadium, and ended the season at 8–8 with a 23–10 victory over the Saints.

2010 season

The Panthers lost several key players during the 2010 off-season from previous seasons, including QB Jake Delhomme, defensive end Julius Peppers, wide receiver Muhsin Muhammad, and cornerback Dante Wesley. Their most notable draft pick was Notre Dame quarterback Jimmy Clausen, who eventually started 10 games during the season. Matt Moore started at QB when the Panthers lost in New York in Week 1, and then fell to Tampa Bay. The 0–2 team benched Moore and installed Clausen as starting QB. After suffering further defeats against Cincinnati, New Orleans, and Chicago, Carolina entered its bye week at 0–5. Moore was brought out as starter again in Week 7 and the Panthers got their first win by defeating San Francisco 23–20. Following another seven-game losing streak, in which Moore was eventually placed on injured reserve, Clausen lead the Panthers to their second win, a 19–12 victory over the Cardinals. In the end, the Panthers finished the season with a record of 2–14 and a last place finish in the NFC South. This marked the team's worst record since 2001 and the worst record in the league that season. However, the team's last-place finish gave them the number one pick in the 2011 NFL Draft.

Ron Rivera era: 2011–2019
After a disappointing 2010 season, John Fox was fired along with most of his coaching staff 24 hours after the regular season concluded. A few months later, the Panthers hired Ron Rivera as the fourth head coach in Panther history. Rivera was previously the defensive coordinator for the Chicago Bears and the San Diego Chargers and in 2006 helped the Bears reach Super Bowl XLI.

2011 season: Cam Newton’s rookie year

The Panthers selected Heisman Trophy and National Championship-winning quarterback Cam Newton with the 1st overall pick of the 2011 NFL Draft. This move was controversial, as Newton's ability to play in the NFL was widely doubted by many experts, but it also showed a clear sign that the Panthers were dissatisfied with Jimmy Clausen. Amid all the speculation, Cam went on to break numerous records. They included Peyton Manning's rookie passing yard record and rushing TD's by a quarterback in a single season. With leadership from Newton, coach Ron Rivera, and a huge comeback season from Steve Smith, the Panthers would finish the 2011 season 6–10 – a four-game improvement over the previous year – and finish 3rd in the division.

2012 season

The Panthers drafted Boston College linebacker Luke Kuechly with the 9th overall pick in the 2012 NFL Draft and unveiled an updated logo and word mark. Carolina started the season 2–8, losing many of them by late-game collapses. A 19–14 loss to the Cowboys resulted in longtime GM Marty Hurney being fired. However, the team managed to win 5 out of their final 6 games to finish with a record of 7–9, good for 2nd in the NFC South. It became their first season with single-digit losses since 2009. The strong finish helped to save head coach Ron Rivera from otherwise losing his job, despite talk of the coach being fired after the season's end.

2013 season

Before the season started, the Panthers hired longtime Giants executive Dave Gettleman as GM. After allowing the Buffalo Bills to score the game-winning touchdown with only 2 seconds left in their week 2 matchup, and then losing 22–6 in week 5 against the Cardinals in which Cam Newton threw three interceptions, the Panthers fell 1–3 to begin the season. Coach Ron Rivera's job was once again in serious jeopardy, along with questions of Newton's leadership.

The team rebounded the following week, beating the Minnesota Vikings 35-10 and unexpectedly went on a then-franchise record eight-game winning streak. During the streak, the Panthers defeated the reigning NFC champion San Francisco 49ers in California and defeated longtime AFC powerhouse New England on Monday Night Football in Charlotte. The Panthers defense, led by second year linebacker Luke Kuechly, became the main star during the streak, holding opponents to 20 points or less. It finally ended in week 14, when Carolina was beaten 31-13 by their division rival New Orleans Saints on Sunday Night Football. The Panthers were able to finish strong with three victories in a row over the Jets and close wins over the Saints and Atlanta Falcons. The latter victory allowed Carolina to clinch their third NFC South title overall and the 2nd seed for the NFC playoffs.

In the Divisional round of the playoffs, the Panthers hosted the 49ers. The reigning conference champions were much healthier than they were in the regular season, and defeated the Panthers 23–10. Following the season, Rivera won Coach of the Year, becoming the second Panthers coach to win the award. Kuechly also won Defensive Player of the Year, the first Panther to win the honor.

2014 season

After a strong start with wins against the Tampa Bay Buccaneers and the Detroit Lions, the Panthers suffered a dismal 1-8-1 record over the next 10 games, falling to 3-8-1 with an embarrassing loss against the Vikings, including having two punts blocked. Their record included a 37–37 overtime tie against the Cincinnati Bengals in Week 6, the first ever tie in both franchise history and NFL history under the current overtime rules.  The tide turned in December, with four consecutive wins against the New Orleans Saints, Tampa Bay Buccaneers, Cleveland Browns, and Atlanta Falcons. With these wins, the Panthers finished the season at 7-8-1.

Despite having a losing record, the Panthers captured their second straight NFC South division title and, for the first time in franchise history, playoff berths in back-to-back years. They were also the first team in NFC South history to have back to back division titles and the second team to win a division title with a sub-.500 record, the first team being the 2010 Seattle Seahawks.  The Panthers defeated the Arizona Cardinals in the Wild Card round, their first postseason victory in nine years, but lost to the Seattle Seahawks in the Divisional round.

2015 season: Super Bowl 50

The Panthers looked to improve on their playoff run from 2014, but things started ominously before the season. Top WR Kelvin Benjamin was lost for the year after tearing his ACL in a non-contact drill during practice. 
Despite what some thought was a major loss in Benjamin, Carolina went on to shock the NFL by achieving both a franchise-best and league-best 15–1 record. This included 14 consecutive victories to start the season, the most by any NFC team in NFL history. The Panthers only regular season loss occurred in the penultimate week of the regular season against the Atlanta Falcons. Season highlights included Cam Newton's flip into the end zone in week 2, defeating Seattle on the road in week 5, an overtime victory over the Colts in week 8, blowing out the Cowboys in the Panthers first Thanksgiving Day game in week 10, winning their third straight division title in week 11, and achieving home-field advantage throughout the playoffs for the first time in franchise history in week 17. Also, ten players (six offensive, four defensive) were selected to the Pro Bowl, the most in team history along with eight All-Pro selections.

In the postseason, the Panthers, having earned home-field advantage, earned a 1st-round bye. At home for the Divisional Round, Carolina faced Seattle in a rematch from the playoffs a year before. After jumping out to a 31-0 halftime lead, the Seahawks stormed back with 24 unanswered points to make it 31–24, however the Panthers would recover the ensuing onside kick, ending Seattle's quest for a possible third consecutive Super Bowl appearance. Next, the Panthers hosted the Arizona Cardinals in their first NFC Championship game appearance since 2005 and the first one played in Charlotte. Carolina routed the Cardinals, forcing seven turnovers en route to a 49–15 victory, their first NFC Championship win since 2003. With the win, Carolina advanced to Super Bowl 50, the team's first appearance in thirteen years. The Panthers were defeated by the Denver Broncos in the Super Bowl by a score of 24–10.

At the NFL Honors, which took place the day before the Super Bowl, it was announced Newton had won the NFL MVP award, becoming the first Panther to ever win the honor. The QB also won Offensive Player of the Year (another first), while Rivera won his second Coach of the Year award in three seasons.

2016 season

Looking to defend their NFC South crown for a fourth straight season, the Panthers backfired. Top corner Josh Norman was cut by GM Dave Gettleman in the offseason. Norman then signed with Washington, leading the team to draft three corners to replace him. The Panthers' year started with a close loss to the Broncos in a Super Bowl rematch. A win against the 49ers the following week didn't help, as the team went 1–5 over the first six weeks. After a week 13 blowout loss to Seattle, the Panthers rebounded to win two straight. However, they couldn't stop the Falcons who won the NFC South, ending Carolina's three-year run. Newton had statistically the worst season of his career and the team finished with a 6–10 record. The season was also marked by the death of former special teams coordinator Bruce DeHaven. Four days after the season ended, team president Danny Morrison resigned. The Panthers also lost defensive coordinator Sean McDermott who became Buffalo's head coach.

2017 season

2017 proved to be among the wildest seasons in Panthers history. Newton underwent offseason shoulder surgery and rehabbed for most of the remaining offseason. Longtime Panthers executive Brandon Beane left to become Buffalo's GM. Days before training camp, owner Jerry Richardson suddenly fired Dave Gettleman. The team hired his predecessor, Marty Hurney, as interim GM. The 2017 regular season had ups and downs, including a week 4 win over defending Super Bowl champion New England and trading WR Kelvin Benjamin to the Bills on Halloween.

However, this all paled to the weekend of December 17. The Panthers entered the weekend 9-4 overall.
On the evening of December 15, the Panthers announced they were undergoing an internal investigation of Richardson for what was termed "workplace misconduct". The NFL announced they were taking over the investigation on Sunday. A few hours later, the Panthers beat the Packers 31–24, intercepting Packers QB Aaron Rodgers three times. Sports Illustrated then published a lengthy article detailing Richardson's multiple workplace allegations, including sexual harassment and racial allegations. A couple hours after the Panthers-Packers game ended, Richardson issued a statement announcing he was putting the team up for sale at the end of the season. The statement made no mention of the SI article. On Monday, December 18, the Panthers announced Richardson was giving up control of the team to Panthers executive Tina Becker.

The Panthers had a chance to win the NFC South in week 17, however, a loss to Atlanta gave the Saints the division title. They finished the regular season 11-5 and made the playoffs. In addition, three Panthers were selected to the All-Pro team (Luke Kuechly, Andrew Norwell, and Daryl Williams). Kuechly, at the time, was the lone Panther voted to the Pro Bowl. In the playoffs, the Panthers season came to an end as they lost to the Saints in the Wild Card round 31–26. Graham Gano, Thomas Davis, and Trai Turner (all alternates) later joined Kuechly as Pro Bowl selections.

2018 season: Under New Ownership

After Jerry Richardson's shocking announcement on December 17, 2017, the Panthers entered 2018 up for sale. The team signed Rivera to a contract extension before the 2017 season ended, keeping him under contract until 2020.

Even before the Panthers had a new owner, changes occurred. Days after the season ended, offensive coordinator Mike Shula and quarterbacks coach Ken Dorsey were fired. The team later lost former assistant head coach/defensive coordinator Steve Wilks, who became Arizona's head coach. Chase Blackburn was also promoted to special teams coordinator. To fill Wilks', Shula's and Dorsey's positions, respectively, former defensive line coach Eric Washington was promoted to defensive coordinator, veteran coach Norv Turner was hired as offensive coordinator and Norv's son Scott was hired as QB coach. The Panthers later announced Marty Hurney would return as GM.

On May 22, at the annual NFL owners meeting, the league approved the team's sale to billionaire and Steelers minority owner David Tepper. Tepper officially became the second owner in team history on July 9. He later hired Tom Glick as team president. Tepper created Tepper Sports & Entertainment as the team's parent company.

The 2018 season went through ups and downs for the Panthers. After starting 6–2, the team collapsed and lost 7 straight. A week 17 win at New Orleans broke the losing streak and gave them a 7–9 record for the season. The team did have 3 Pro Bowlers: MLB Luke Kuechly, G Trai Turner, and DT Kawann Short.

2019 season

Despite the collapse in 2018, the Panthers staff changed little during the offseason compared to the previous year. Perry Fewell was hired as secondary coach. Former Panthers Everette Brown and Ben Jacobs were named assistant defensive line coach and assistant special teams coach, respectively. Longtime running backs coach Jim Skipper also retired. The Panthers also signed several free agents including LB Bruce Irvin, WR Chris Hogan, DT Gerald McCoy, and S Tre Boston who previously played for the Panthers from 2014 to 2016.

The Panthers lost 3 veteran players during the offseason. C Ryan Kalil, LB Thomas Davis, and DE Julius Peppers either retired or, in Davis' case, were released.

The 2019 season started off poorly. Newton was lost for the year after week 2 due to a foot injury. Backup Kyle Allen rallied the team to win four straight. At 5–2, the Panthers derailed, losing their last nine games to finish with a 5–11 record. Rivera was fired on December 3 with Perry Fewell taking over as interim head coach. Running back Christian McCaffrey, however, was a lone bright spot, as he broke several records and became only the third player in NFL history with both 1,000 rushing and receiving yards in a season. McCaffrey joined Kuechly and Trai Turner as the team's Pro Bowl selections.

Matt Rhule era: 2020–2022
With Ron Rivera fired during the 2019 season, the Panthers commenced a coaching search. In January 2020, Matt Rhule was hired as the Panthers fifth head coach. Rhule previously coached at Baylor and Temple, turning both programs into contenders. He also spent a season on the Giants staff in 2012.

2020 season

During the offseason, the Panthers with parted two key members of Super Bowl 50: former 2015 MVP Cam Newton was released and signed with the New England Patriots and linebacker Luke Kuechly retired immediately after the 2019 season. Rhule brought on a new coaching staff aside from special teams coach Chase Blackburn, who was retained. At the 2020 NFL Draft the Panthers used all seven picks on defense, a first in franchise history. The picks included defensive tackle Derrick Brown and safety/cornerback Jeremy Chinn. The Panthers would replace Newton with Teddy Bridgewater.

With preseason games cancelled, the 2020 season proved difficult for the team. The Panthers lost eight games by seven points or less, including last-second losses to the Saints and Chiefs. McCaffrey spent most of the year hampered by various injuries, allowing backup Mike Davis to start most of the games at running back. On December 21, the Panthers fired general manager Marty Hurney for the second time. The would finish the season 5-11, repeating their record from the previous year.

2021 season

Changes came for the Panthers before the offseason even started. On January 14, after a long search process, Scott Fitterer was named General Manager. Fitterer previously spent many years in Seattle's front office, helping draft numerous players. Before the draft, the Panthers traded with the Jets for QB Sam Darnold. Bridgewater was traded to the Broncos days later for an extra draft pick. During the 2021 NFL Draft, the Panthers selected cornerback Jaycee Horn with the 8th overall pick. They also made five trades, the most in franchise history.

After starting the season 3-0, the Panthers fell off a cliff. Injuries to McCaffrey, inconsistent QB play and a poor offensive line doomed the team in many games. Horn was also injured early and missed most of his rookie season. The defense overall was a highlight, however, they could not mask all the offensive woes. The Panthers started three different QB's, including Cam Newton, who returned to the team in the middle of the season. Offensive Coordinator Joe Brady was fired with the team's record at 5-7. They wouldn't win another game after Brady's firing, finishing the year a disappointing 5-12.

2022 season
The Panthers started the offseason firing three assistant coaches, including two hired by Ron Rivera. Carolina brought in Ben McAdoo, formerly the Giants head coach, to be their new offensive coordinator. The team drafted well, selecting offensive lineman Ikem Ekwonu with the 6th overall pick and QB Matt Corral in the third round, among others. Before the start of the season, the team signed former Browns QB Baker Mayfield. Mayfield would wind up as the starter due to preseason injuries to Darnold and Corral. 

Carolina started off the season with a loss and it didn't improve much from there. The team went 1-4 through their first 5 games with Mayfield and the offense receiving particular criticism. A home loss to the 49ers in week 5 proved a low point for both the team and the fan base. Rhule was fired the next day, October 10th. Steve Wilks became the team's interim head coach. Defensive coordinator Phil Snow and assistant special teams coach Ed Foley were also let go. 

Under Wilks, the Panthers improved, finishing the season with a 7-10 record. Wilks went 6-6 as the interim head coach. Mayfield was released during the season as PJ Walker and Darnold both started at QB. Brian Burns was also named to his second Pro Bowl with several other players named as alternates.

Frank Reich era: 2023–present
The Panthers held another coaching search during the 2022 offseason. On January 26, the team announced the hiring of former Colts head coach Frank Reich as the sixth head coach in team history. Reich is the first offensive-minded coach ever hired by the Panthers and served as the Panthers first starting quarterback in 1995.

References 

Carolina Panthers
Carolina Panthers